The Pennsylvania wood cockroach (Parcoblatta pensylvanica) or Pennsylvanian cockroach is a common species of cockroach in eastern and central North America.

Description

Males are dark brown; the sides of the thorax and the front half of the wings are margined with yellow. Adult males are fully winged, while females have conspicuous wing pads (actually short wings like that of the female oriental cockroach), which are functionless. Wings of the male are longer than its body, while wing pads of the female cover only one-third to two-thirds of the abdomen. The males fly swiftly but do not have the ability to sustain themselves in the air for long periods.

Habitat and ecology
The species occurs in open, timbered areas with little ground cover. According to entomologist Fred A. Lawson, it is "often seen on tree trunks and lower branches of oaks and elms after dark." Nymphs and adults are also found outdoors beneath loose bark in woodpiles, stumps, and hollow trees. Brought indoors on infested firewood, they wander about the house without congregating in any particular room. They can be especially troublesome during the mating season, which is during May and June. Male wood cockroaches frequently travel in large numbers and fly considerable distances. They are attracted to lights at night and may gain entry indoors. Large numbers may also be found in rain gutters of homes.

Pennsylvania wood cockroaches feed primarily on decaying organic matter. Both female and male Pennsylvania wood cockroaches have been found under shingles and on the inside of garages. They rarely breed indoors. However, with the growing use of firewood, the popularity of cedar shake shingles, and the continual building of homes in wooded areas, problems with Pennsylvania wood cockroaches will probably escalate.

Reproduction

The Pennsylvania wood cockroach has three developmental stages: egg, nymph, and adult. Eggs are laid in egg capsules, produced during the warm months and deposited behind the loose bark of dead trees, fallen logs, or stumps. Egg capsules are yellowish brown and characteristically curved on both sides like a half moon. Capsules are twice as long as wide, each containing up to 32 eggs. The egg stage lasts about 34 days at 80 °F, while the nymphal stage typically lasts 10 to 12 months but can last up to 2 years. The normal life span of the female adult is several months.

Distribution
The distribution of the species includes southeastern Canada, in the provinces of Ontario and Quebec, and the eastern and central United States, in Alabama, the District of Columbia, probably Florida, Delaware, Georgia, Virginia, Illinois, Indiana, Iowa, Kansas, Louisiana, Massachusetts, Maine, Maryland, Michigan, Minnesota, Mississippi, Missouri, Nebraska, New Jersey, New York, North Carolina, Ohio, Oklahoma, Pennsylvania, South Dakota, Tennessee, Texas, and Wisconsin.

A 1966 article said that it is the only species of cockroach that is definitely native to Ontario, while a 1987 update also included Parcoblatta virginica and Parcoblatta uhleriana as indigenous to the province.

Structural and environmental modifications and repairs
Pennsylvania wood cockroaches are most often carried into homes under the bark of firewood. It is best to not store firewood inside the house. Move woodpiles away from the house to further reduce the likelihood of cockroaches wandering in.

Houses located within woods will sometimes have wood cockroaches crawl under siding; especially homes with cedar shake shingles. To cockroaches, the house may represent a fallen tree and a new location for nesting. A wide lawn will inhibit cockroaches crawling from the surrounding woods to the house. The use of window screening and caulking to prevent entry is a good structural tactic.

The species frequently invades summer cottages, and while it is considered a nuisance, it is rarely in enough numbers to be considered a pest.

Chemical control
As breeding populations rarely become established indoors, house interiors should not be treated. Treat exteriors only when wood cockroaches enter homes from the surrounding environment.

Exterior treatments to foundations, around doors and windows, porches, patios and other areas where outside lights are located will help control both the adult males (which will fly to the lights) and the females (which crawl to the house in search of harborage).

Additional images

See also
 Wood cockroach
 List of cockroaches of Texas

References

 http://ento.psu.edu/extension/factsheets/pennsylvania-wood-cockroaches

External links

 Drawing of dorsal view of an adult male P. pensylvanica, from 1918 Illinois Natural History Survey Bulletin.
 Drawing of dorsal view of an adult female P. pensylvanica (Plate VI, figure 3), as well as views of body parts of the species, and drawings of other species. From 1917 Memoirs of the American Entomological Society, with keys to P. pensylvanica figures on pages 278-280.
 Photographs of preserved specimens of P. pensylvanica from the Biodiversity Institute of Ontario at the University of Guelph, published under a CreativeCommons license.
Black and white photograph  of top view of P. pensylvanica female with ootheca from Smithsonian Miscellaneous Collections.

Cockroaches
Insects of Canada
Insects of the United States
Insects described in 1773